Latrobe or La Trobe may refer to:

People
 Christian Ignatius Latrobe (1758–1836), English clergyman and musician
 Charles La Trobe (1801–1875), first lieutenant-governor of Victoria, Australia, son of C. I. Latrobe
 Benjamin Henry Latrobe (1764–1820), architect of the United States Capitol, brother of C. I. Latrobe
 Benjamin Henry Latrobe II (1806–1878), (or sometimes "Jr."), an engineer, son of B. H. Latrobe
 Charles Hazlehurst Latrobe, (1833–1902), engineer, bridge-builder, architect, son of B. H. Latrobe II
 Henry Sellon Boneval Latrobe (1792–1817), architect, eldest son of B. H. Latrobe
 John Hazlehurst Boneval Latrobe (1803–1891), writer, lawyer, historian, artist, inventor, civic activist, son of B. H. Latrobe
 Ferdinand Claiborne Latrobe (1833–1911), Mayor of Baltimore (elected seven times), son of John H. B. Latrobe
 Henry Latrobe Roosevelt (1879–1936), Assistant Secretary of the United States Navy, grandnephew of John H. B. Latrobe

Geography
Australia
 City of Latrobe, Victoria
 Latrobe River, West Gippsland, Victoria, Australia
 Latrobe Valley, Gippsland, Victoria, Australia
 Mount LaTrobe, Wilsons Promontory, Victoria, Australia
 Latrobe, Tasmania
 Latrobe Council, the local government area that contains the town in Tasmania
 La Trobe Street, Melbourne

United States
 Latrobe, California
 Latrobe, Pennsylvania
 Latrobe, West Virginia
 Latrobe Park, Baltimore, public park in Locust Point, Maryland

Other
 HMAS Latrobe, Royal Australian Navy, naval warship (Bathurst-class corvette), 1942–53
 Latrobe Brewing Company in Latrobe, Pennsylvania, brewers of "Rolling Rock" beer
 Latrobe Football Club of Latrobe, Tasmania
 Latrobe Athletic Association of Latrobe, Pennsylvania, from 1895 to 1909, one of the earliest professional American football teams
 Banksia Latrobe Secondary College, Heidelberg West, Victoria, Australia
 Charles La Trobe College, Macleod, Victoria, Australia
 La Trobe University, Victoria, Australia
 La Trobe University College of Northern Victoria, Bendigo
 Latrobe Stove, cast-iron stove for home or room heating, invented early 1800s by John H. B. Latrobe in Baltimore
 Latrobe (horse), thoroughbred racehorse, winner of the 2018 Irish Derby

See also
 La Trobe (disambiguation)